Total Drumming is a collection of loops and samples by Mick Fleetwood, released on October 2, 2001. The album is a combination of drum loops. Fleetwood is featured as the only performer on all of the songs. The album was produced by Mike Scheibinger and Jonathon Todd. The album was released by Sony Creative Software.

Track listing
All songs written by Mick Fleetwood
Mysterious Echos
Straight Up
Dry Grooves and Fills
Grooves and Fills
Oneshots
Percussion
Vocal Bites

Personnel
Mick Fleetwood - vocals, drums, percussion, cowbell, toms

References

Mick Fleetwood albums
2001 albums